Max Knake (born April 11, 1973) is a former American football quarterback who played one season with the Grand Rapids Rampage of the Arena Football League. He played college football at Texas Christian University.

References

External links
Just Sports Stats
College tats

Living people
1973 births
Players of American football from Texas
Sportspeople from the Dallas–Fort Worth metroplex
American football quarterbacks
TCU Horned Frogs football players
Grand Rapids Rampage players
People from McKinney, Texas